Kevin Carl Rhoades (born November 26, 1957) is an American prelate of the Roman Catholic Church. He has been serving as bishop of Diocese of Fort Wayne-South Bend in Indiana since 2009.  Rhoades previously served as the bishop of the Diocese of Harrisburg in Pennsylvania from 2004 to 2009.

In 2021, Rhoades led the United States Conference of Bishops’ Committee on Doctrine, which, critics argued, targeted President Joe Biden for his stance on abortion rights.

Early life
Kevin Rhoades was born on November 26, 1957, in Mahanoy City, Pennsylvania to Charles and Mary Rhoades. The second of three children, he has an older brother and a younger sister. His father was a cousin of Republican State Senator James J. Rhoades.

Raised in Lebanon, Pennsylvania, Rhoades graduated from Lebanon Catholic High School in 1975 and then studied at Mount St. Mary's University in Emmitsburg, Maryland, for two years. Rhoades applied to the Diocese of Harrisburg for enrollment in the program of priestly formation, and in 1977 entered St. Charles Borromeo Seminary in Wynnewood, Pennsylvania.  He earned his Bachelor of Philosophy degree in 1979.

From 1979 to 1983, Rhoades studied theology at the Pontifical North American College and the Pontifical Gregorian University in Rome, obtaining his Bachelor of Sacred Theology degree. He also studied Spanish at the Pontifical University of Salamanca in Salamanca, Spain during the summer of 1982. Then Archbishop Terence Cooke ordained him a deacon at St. Peter’s Basilica, Rome, in 1982.

Priesthood
Rhoades was ordained to the priesthood for the Diocese of Harrisburg by then Bishop William Keeler on July 9, 1983.  After his ordination, Rhodes served as parochial vicar at St. Patrick Parish in York, Pennsylvania, until 1985. During this time, he also ministered in the Spanish-speaking apostolates at Cristo Salvador Parish in York and Cristo Rey Mission in Bendersville, Pennsylvania. In 1985, Rhoades returned to the Gregorian University, earning a Licentiate of Sacred Theology in 1986 and a Licentiate of Canon Law in 1988.

After returning to Harrisburg, Rhoades was named assistant chancellor to Bishop Keeler. He also served as director of the Spanish apostolate in Dauphin, Cumberland, and Perry counties. In 1990, Rhoades was appointed pastor of Saint Francis of Assisi Parish in Harrisburg, serving there for five years.  In 1995, he became a professor at Mount St. Mary’s Seminary, teaching in systematic theology, canon law, and Hispanic ministry.  Rhoades was appointed rector of Mount St. Mary's in July 1997.

Episcopal career

Bishop of Harrisburg

On October 14, 2004, Rhoades was appointed as the ninth bishop of the Diocese of Harrisburg by Pope John Paul II. He received his episcopal consecration on December 9, 2004, from Cardinal Justin Rigali, with Cardinal Keeler and Bishop Thomas Olmsted serving as co-consecrators. Rhoades selected as his episcopal motto: Veritatem In Caritate, meaning, "Truth in Charity" (Ephesians 4:15).

Within the United States Conference of Catholic Bishops (USCCB), Rhoades was a member of the Committee on Ecumenical and Interreligious Affairs, the Committee on Pastoral Practices, and the Subcommittee on the Catechism. He chaired the Committee on Laity, Marriage, Family Life and Youth.

In 2006, Rhoades recommended to the Vatican that William Presley, a priest in the diocese, be laicized.  Presley had faced allegations of sexual abuse in the 1970's when he was assigned to the University of Notre Dame in Notre Dame, Indiana.  In his letter, Rhoades termed Presley as a "sexual predator" and a danger to the Catholic community.  However, Rhoades did not report him to the general public, fearing scandal.  The Presley case was revealed in 2018 by the Pennsylvania Grand Jury investigation of sexual abuse in the church.  The grand jury also revealed that in 2007 Rhoades told the Vatican that he had ordered a second priest accused of sexual abuse to spend the rest of his life in penance.  Again, Rhoades did not report the priest to the public due to concern about scandal.  In response to both cases, Rhoades in 2018 said he followed all the procedures then in place and reported the two priests to law enforcement.

Bishop of Fort Wayne-South Bend
On November 14, 2009, Pope Benedict XVI named Rhoades as the ninth bishop of the Diocese of Fort Wayne-South Bend. At a special Vespers service at the Cathedral on Sunday, January 3, 2010, the Diocese of Harrisburg made a formal farewell to Rhoades. In 2011, he became the first bishop to grant an imprimatur to an iPhone application. During the 2017 Fall General Assembly of the USCCB, Rhoades was elected chair of the Conference's Committee on Doctrine.

On August 1, 2018, Bishop Ronald Gainer, Rhoades' successor as bishop of Harrisburg, announced that the names of every bishop of Harrisburg from 1947 onward—including Rhoades' -- would be removed from any building or room in the diocese named in their honor.  This action was due to the bishops' failures to protect parishioners from sexual abuse by clerics.  A room in St. Patrick Cathedral was named after Rhodes.

On August 17, 2018, Rhoades announced that he would release the full list of clergy in the Diocese of Fort Wayne-South Bend who were credibly accused of sexual abuse "in a matter of weeks."  Rhoades noted that he previously listed the names of three priests who he removed from the diocese due to allegations of sexual abuse. On September 18, 2018, Rhoades released the names of 18 priests and deacons who were credibly accused of sexually abusing minors. That same month, an unidentified male claimed that Rhoades had sexually abused him as a minor.  After a brief investigation, the Dauphin County District Attorney declared the accusation to be unfounded.

A lawsuit against Rhoades and the Diocese of Harrisburg was filed in July 2019 by Donald Asbee, a Pennsylvania resident.  Asbee alleged that he was sexually abused as a boy by two diocesan priests and that the diocese and its bishops tried to cover up the priests' crimes.  The Diocese of Harrisburg had offered Asbee a $176,875 settlement, but he rejected it and sued instead.

Rhoades is a leading member of the USCCB's National Eucharistic Revival. For the feast of Corpus Christi in 2022, he arranged a Eucharistic Procession in the Diocese of Fort Wayne-South Bend which drew nearly 5,000 participants and garnered national attention. 

On November 16, 2022, Rhoades was elected as chair of the USCCB's Committee on Religious Liberty.

See also

 Catholic Church hierarchy
 Catholic Church in the United States
 Historical list of the Catholic bishops of the United States
 List of Catholic bishops of the United States
 Lists of patriarchs, archbishops, and bishops

References

External links
Diocese of Fort Wayne-South Bend official website
Diocese of Harrisburg official website

Episcopal succession

 

1957 births
Living people
People from Mahanoy City, Pennsylvania
21st-century Roman Catholic bishops in the United States
Roman Catholic bishops of Fort Wayne–South Bend
Roman Catholic bishops of Harrisburg
Mount St. Mary's University alumni
St. Charles Borromeo Seminary alumni
Pontifical University of Salamanca alumni